Astro: An Urban Fable in a Magical Rio de Janeiro (Portuguese: Astro, Uma Fábula Urbana em um Rio de Janeiro Mágico) is a 2012 Brazilian adventure-drama film  directed by Paula Trabulsi.

The film is part of a project that involves visual art, street culture, cuisine and urban interventions.

Plot
Daughter of a Brazilian mother and Swedish father, Astro leaves her life in Sweden to visit Rio de Janeiro. She travels to the city to get a house that she had inherited, but ends up getting longer than expected. Eventually, she ends up meeting Alice and her group of friends, starting to interact more with the city.

Music
 "Rain-Bow" - AlbiNOI
 "Off Pictures" - AlbiNOI
 "Broken Monitors" - Bernhard Fleischmann
 "Corra e Olhe o Céu" - Cartola
 "Haps" - Duo 505
 "Our Thing" - Evan Voytas
 "I Have a Dream in my Heart" - Evan Voytas
 "Aether" - Hildur Guðnadóttir
 "Ascent" - Hildur Guðnadóttir
 "Gunnera" - Isan
 "Channel Ten" - Isan
 "One More Year" - Channel Ten
 "Pianosong Two" - Channel Ten
 "A. Klingtmann" - Channel Ten
 "Plokk" - Channel Ten
 "Flock" - Channel Ten
 "Bit My Leg Off" - Tsukimono
 "Sofi is Sad" - Tsukimono

References

External links
  
 

2010s Portuguese-language films
Brazilian adventure drama films
Films set in Rio de Janeiro (city)
Films scored by Hildur Guðnadóttir
Films shot in Rio de Janeiro (city)
2010s adventure drama films
2012 drama films
2012 films